Princessa, born Mónica Capel Cruz, is a Spanish pop/dance singer. Born on 18 May 1975, she first became known for her participation in "World On Ice" in Madrid and in Spain's Gran Circo Mundial. She was discovered by producer Frank Peterson at the age of 16 and a few years later recorded her first album. She has produced three full-length records released in Europe and Japan, and a fourth, All I Want, is in production, having released the title single. Princessa recorded a cover version of Valerie Dore's The Night on her self-titled debut. She came back in 2014 with a two date tour in Finland. A new and bigger tour in 2015 in Finland was done at summer.

Discography

Albums
 1993: Princessa (EMI Electrola)
 1996: Calling You (East West Records)
 1997: Princessa (East West Records)
 1999: I Won't Forget You (East West Records)

Singles
1993: "Rojo Y Llanto" (EMI Electrola)
1994: "Ensalza Tu Amor" (EMI Electrola)
1994: "Tú estás loco" (EMI Electrola)
1996: "Calling You" (East West Records)
1996: "Anyone But You" (East West Records)
1997: "Try To Say I'm Sorry" (East West Records)
1997: "Baila Al Ritmo" (East West Records)
1997: "Vivo" (East West Records)
1997: "Summer Of Love" (East West Records)
1998: "Snowflakes" (East West Records)
1999: "I Won't Forget You" (East West Records)
1999: "(You Just) Believe In You" (East West Records)
2005: "All I Want" (Edel Records)

External links
 Official Facebook Site
Fan site
Nemo Studio

1975 births
Living people
English-language singers from Spain
Singers from Madrid
21st-century Spanish singers
21st-century Spanish women singers
Spanish circus performers